Procambarus reimeri is a species of crayfish in the family Cambaridae. It is endemic to the Upper Irons Fork of the Ouachita River basin in Polk County, Arkansas.

References

Cambaridae
Polk County, Arkansas
Natural history of Arkansas
Endemic fauna of the United States
Freshwater crustaceans of North America
Taxonomy articles created by Polbot
Crustaceans described in 1979
Taxa named by Horton H. Hobbs Jr.